Anégrée Freese is a football (soccer) club from Central African Republic based in Bangui.

The team plays in the Central African Republic League.

Stadium
Currently the team plays at the 50,000 capacity Barthelemy Boganda Stadium.

References

External links
Soccerway

Football clubs in the Central African Republic
Bangui